Choi Jong-Keun (최 종근, born ) is a South Korean male weightlifter, competing in the 105 kg category and representing South Korea at international competitions. He participated at the 2000 Summer Olympics in the 105 kg event. He competed at world championships, most recently at the 1999 World Weightlifting Championships.

Major results
 - 1997 World Championships Sub-Heavyweight class (387.5 kg)
 - 1998 Asian Games Heavyweight class

References

External links
 

1976 births
Living people
South Korean male weightlifters
Weightlifters at the 2000 Summer Olympics
Olympic weightlifters of South Korea
Place of birth missing (living people)
Weightlifters at the 1998 Asian Games
Weightlifters at the 2002 Asian Games
Asian Games medalists in weightlifting
Asian Games bronze medalists for South Korea
Medalists at the 1998 Asian Games
World Weightlifting Championships medalists
20th-century South Korean people
21st-century South Korean people